Adela tsaratanana is a species of moth of the family Adelidae. It is known from Madagascar.

References

Adelidae
Moths described in 1954
Moths of Madagascar
Taxa named by Pierre Viette